Stickney Memorial Art School, also known as Stickney Art Institute and Stickney Memorial School of Fine Arts, was an art school in operation between c.1912 until 1934 in Pasadena, California. The school was an early precursor to the Norton Simon Museum, founded in 1969.

History
Upon opening in c. 1912, the school was led by Jean Mannheim and Channel Pickering Townsley. In the early years of the school, Townsley served as director and Mannheim served as the sole instructor and the school offered summer classes with a costumed model posed in the open air and offered outdoor landscape painting in winter. It also offered charcoal drawing, pen-and-ink drawing, and still life drawing, drawing students from all over the country.

It was originally located at Stickney Hall, on the corner of Fair Oaks Avenue and Lincoln Avenue in Pasadena (now the 134 and 210 freeways), built and donated by Susan Homer Stickney in memory of her sister. In 1934 the original location was razed and the new location was at Carmelita Gardens and changed names to Pasadena Art Institute.

In the 1930s, artist Lorser Feitelson taught at Stickney Memorial Art School, and it was at the school he met pupil Helen Lundeberg, they would later marry and work as artistic collaborators. Together in 1934, Feitelson and Lundeberg founded Subjective Classicism (or New Classicism), which later became known as Post Surrealism. Another one of Feitelson's students was painter Gerrie Gutmann.

The Pasadena Art Institute changed its name to the Pasadena Art Museum in 1954, and eventually became the Norton Simon Museum.

Notable alumni 

Gerrie Gutmann
Sam Hyde Harris (1889– 1977)
 Kathryn Leighton (1875–1952)
 Helen Lundeberg
 Ruth Miller
 F. Carl Smith (1868–1955),
 Harry Tillcock (1882–1973)
 Grace Vollmer

Notable faculty 

 Mildred Bryant Brooks (1901–1995)
 Alson S. Clark
Grace Clements
Roland Coate
Lorser Feitelson
Gordon Kaufmann
Lucile Lloyd, also served as director.
 Jean Mannheim (1861–1945)
Richard Edward Miller
 Guy Rose, also served as director.
 Channel Pickering Townsley

See also 

 California Art Club, many of the alumni and faculty were members

References

External links 

 Stickney Memorial Art School (1912–1922) online archives at the Caltech Archives

Art schools in California
Defunct private universities and colleges in California
1912 establishments in California
1934 disestablishments in California